The Bolero is a 1973 American short documentary film directed by Allan Miller and William Fertik. It won an Oscar at the 46th Academy Awards in 1974 for Best Short Subject.

Cast
 Zubin Mehta as Himself, Conductor
 Ernest Fleishman as Himself, Executive Director L.A. Philharmonic
 Anne Diener Giles as Herself, Flute
 Michele Zukovsky as Herself, Clarinet
 Merritt Buxbaum as Himself, E. Flat Clarinet
 Alan Goodman as Himself, Bassoon
 Robert DiVall as Himself, Trumpet
 Franklin Stokes as Himself, Saxophone
 Henry Sigismonti as Himself, French Horn
 H. Dennis Smith as Himself, Trombone
 Miles Zentner as Himself, Piccolo
 Los Angeles Philharmonic Orchestra

Availability
The Bolero was released on DVD by First Run Features alongside In Search of Cezanne, another documentary  short, this time about French pre-cubist artist Paul Cézanne, on May 22, 2007.

See also
 Boléro
 Allegro Non Troppo-1976 animated film that also famously used The Bolero
 1973 in film

References

External links

, officially posted by William Fertik himself
The New York Times article about said film

1973 films
1973 documentary films
1973 short films
1973 independent films
1970s short documentary films
1970s English-language films
American short documentary films
American independent films
Concert films
Documentary films about classical music and musicians
Live Action Short Film Academy Award winners
1970s American films